The International Institute for Strategic Studies (IISS) is a British research institute or think tank in the area of international affairs. Since 1997, its headquarters have been at Arundel House in London.

The 2017 Global Go To Think Tank Index ranked IISS as the tenth-best think tank worldwide and the second-best Defence and National Security think tank globally, while Transparify ranked it third-largest UK think tank by expenditure, but gave it its lowest rating, "deceptive", on funding transparency.

Overview 
The current director-general and chief executive is John Chipman. Sir Michael Howard, the British military historian, founded the institute together with the British Labour MP Denis Healey (Defence Secretary, 1964–1970 and Chancellor, 1974–1979) and University of Oxford academic Alastair Francis Buchan.

Based in London, the IISS is both a private company limited by guarantee in UK law and a registered charity.

Research 
The institute has worked with governments, defence ministries and global organisations such as NATO.

Publications 
In 2011 the institute published the FARC files—documents captured from the Revolutionary Armed Forces of Colombia that shed light on the movement's inner workings.

The 2017 Global Go To Think Tank Index ranked the Shangri-La Dialogue as the best Think tank conference worldwide.

History
Raymond L. Garthoff wrote in 2004:

Controversy
In 2016, The Guardian reported that IISS "has been accused of jeopardising its independence after leaked documents showed it has secretly received £25m from the Bahraini royal family", noting that leaked "documents reveal that IISS and Bahrain's rulers specifically agreed to keep the latter's funding for the Manama Dialogues secret". The IISS did not dispute the authenticity of the leaked documents or deny receiving funding from Bahrain, but issued a response stating that "[a]ll IISS contractual agreements, including those with host governments, contain a clause asserting the institute's absolute intellectual and operational independence as an international organisation that does not participate in any manner of advocacy".

Peter Oborne in Middle East Eye subsequently reported that IISS may have received nearly half of its total income from Bahraini sources in some years.

Directors 
 Alastair Buchan (1958–1969)
 François Duchêne (1969–1974)
 Christoph Bertram (1974–1982)
 Robert J. O'Neill (1982–1987)
 François Heisbourg (1987–1992)
 Bo Huldt (1992–1993)
 John Chipman (1993–present)

Council 
Council members  2017 are:
 Professor François Heisbourg, Chairman of the IISS and of the Geneva Centre for Security Policy
 Joanne de Asis, founder and chairperson, Asia Pacific Capital Partners
 Fleur de Villiers, journalist
 Field Marshal Charles Guthrie, Baron Guthrie of Craigiebank
 Bill Emmott, journalist
 Michael Fullilove, academic
 Marillyn A. Hewson, Chairman, President and CEO of Lockheed Martin
 Badr Jafar, President of Crescent Petroleum
 Bilahari Kausikan, Ambassador-at-Large, Ministry of Foreign Affairs (Singapore)
 Ellen Laipson, president and CEO, Henry L Stimson Center
 Chung Min Lee, Professor of International Relations, Yonsei University
 Eric X. Li, founder and managing director, Chengwei Capital
 Jean-Claude Mallet, Councillor of State (France)
 Moeletsi Mbeki
 Michael D. Rich
 Charles Powell, Baron Powell of Bayswater
 George Robertson, Baron Robertson of Port Ellen
 Ambassador Andrés Rozental Gutman, President, Rozental & Asociados
 Thomas Seaman, Fellow and Bursar, All Souls College, Oxford
 Grace Reksten Skaugen, chair of Norwegian Institute of Directors and deputy chair of Statoil
 Major-General Amos Yadlin, former IAF General
 Igor Yurgens, chairman of the management board of the Institute of Contemporary Development

See also 
 List of think tanks in the United Kingdom

References

External links 
 

Foreign policy and strategy think tanks based in the United Kingdom
Private companies limited by guarantee of the United Kingdom